Jacques Aliamet (30 November 1726 in Abbeville – 29 May 1788 in Paris) was a French engraver. His brother François-Germain Aliamet was also an engraver. He perfected drypoint and his several surviving works include engravings after Nicolaes Berchem, Philips Wouwerman and Claude Joseph Vernet.

External links

 Life and works of Jacques Aliamet 

1726 births
1788 deaths
18th-century French engravers
People from Abbeville